Girish Chandra 'Gary' Saxena (5 January 1928 – 14 April 2017) was a governor of Jammu and Kashmir state in India. Born in Agra in 1928, he joined the Indian Police Service (IPS) and held many positions in police and retired as Director of the Research and Analysis Wing, India's external intelligence agency. He took over as the head of the State on 2 May 1998 for the second time. Earlier, he held the office of the Governor J&K from 26 May 1990 to 13 March 1993.

Personal life
Saxena was born at Agra in 1928. He had his early education in Government College Allahabad and G.N. K. High School, Kanpur. He did Intermediate course from Queen's Intermediate College, Varanasi; graduated with a Bachelor of Arts degree from the University of Allahabad in 1946 and obtained the Post-Graduate Degree of Master of Arts (History) from the same university in 1948. His brother, Naresh Chandra, was the Indian ambassador to the United States.

Career
Saxena joined the Indian Police Service in 1950 and served in Uttar Pradesh as Chief of Police in various districts including Rampur, Aligarh, Bareilly and Allahabad. Later, he was deputed to the Government of India in April 1969, served in Research and Analysis Wing for 16 years, and headed it from 1983 to 1986. He was chief of the agency during the Kanishka Bombing and Operation Blue Star. Thereafter, he remained as advisor to the then Prime Minister of India Rajiv Gandhi for two years till 31 January 1988.

Saxena's main areas of specialization were international affairs, national security and intelligence matters. He has attended international Conferences in India and abroad on these subjects, given talks and participated in many seminars and panel discussions. He addressed the Lal Bahadur Shastri National Academy of Administration in 1998. The Government of India awarded him the civilian honour of the Padma Bhushan in 2005.

Death
Saxena died on 14 April 2017 after a brief illness, aged 89.

References

External links
 https://web.archive.org/web/20190108045704/http://jkrajbhawan.nic.in/His%20Excellency/present10.htm
 http://www.rediff.com/news/1999/nov/09gary.htm

1928 births
2017 deaths
Indian Police Service officers
People from Agra
University of Allahabad alumni
Governors of Jammu and Kashmir
Uttar Pradesh Police
People of the Research and Analysis Wing
Recipients of the Padma Bhushan in civil service